Mark David Turnbull  (born 11 October 1973) is an Australian sailor and Olympic champion. He won a gold medal in the 470 Class with Tom King at the 2000 Summer Olympics in Sydney. He and King were inducted into the Australian Sailing Hall of Fame in 2022.

Turnbull was educated at St. Leonard's College in Brighton East, Victoria, Australia.

References

External links
 
 
 
 

1973 births
Living people
Australian male sailors (sport)
Olympic sailors of Australia
Olympic gold medalists for Australia
Olympic medalists in sailing
Sailors at the 2000 Summer Olympics – 470
Medalists at the 2000 Summer Olympics
Recipients of the Medal of the Order of Australia
470 class world champions
World champions in sailing for Australia